The Church of Our Lady of Lourdes was officially established by Father Emile Marie Henri Sausseau (MEP) in 1905 at Ipoh, Malaysia.

Priests
Numerous priests from Paris foreign missions (MEP) and from Malaysia have served as parish priests and assistant parish priests at this church.

Vocations from the Parish 
The Church of Our Lady of Lourdes has created numerous priests, sisters, brothers, and deacons.

Catholic Priests

La Salle Brother

Religious Sisters

Permanent Deacon

Papal Gold Medal "Bene Merenti" 
The recipient of Papal Gold Medal "Bene Merenti". A meritorious medal awarded by Pope.

Pro Ecclesia et Pontifice "Cross of Honour" 
The recipient of Cross of Honour "Pro Ecclesia et Pontifice". The highest medal that can be awarded to the laity by the Pope.

Roman Catholic churches in Malaysia
Churches in Perak
Buildings and structures in Ipoh
20th-century Roman Catholic church buildings in Malaysia